Sreekumari Ramachandran is a Malayalam–language novelist, short story writer, orator, columnist, trained dancer and an accomplished singer from Kerala, India.

Biography
Sreekumari was born and brought up in Cochin. She is a graduate in Economics and is a Visharad in Hindi language. From a very early age, she was trained in Karnatic music and dance.

At the age of 10, in 1960 she won the 1st prize for folk dance in the Kerala State School Youth Festival. In the year 1962, she again won the 1st prize for Bharatanatyam and in 1964, won 1st prize for Music. IN 1966, won Ramankutty Menon Gold Medal for Karnatic Music from Maharaja's College Ernakulam.

After an early marriage to Adv.C.Ramachandra Menon, she chose to live the quite life of a homemaker for nearly twenty years. She started writing in the year 1988. By 1992 she got auditioned by the All India Radio and was subsequently elevated to B High grade in music. Since then she has presented Sugam Sangeet and Bhakthi Sangeeth on A.I.R Trichur and Doordarshan Trivandrum. She is the Founder President of Indian Society of Authors (Kerala Chapter), President of Toon Arts India, New Delhi and was the member of Kerala Sangeetha Nataka Academy from 2002 to 2005. She has also served as a jury member of Kerala State Film Award Committee, Mathrubhumi – Medimix Film Award Committee and Filmfare Awards Committee.

Works

Short Stories
 Nirmalyam – N B S Publications – 1993
 Parithraanam – D. C. Books −1995
 Thaiveru – Geethanjali Publications −1997
 Nakshatrangalkku Niramundo – Pen Books – 1999
 Vidhavakalude Graamam – Pen Books – 1999
 Pala Veshangalil Chila Manushyar – Pen Books – 2001
 Silence of the Grove – Millennium Books Delhi – 2003
 Muhajeer – Poorna Publications – 2005
 Pulachinthu – Poorna Publications – 2008
 Call girl – N B S Publications – 2011

Novels
 Kaalame Maappu Tharu – Geethanjali Publications – 1997
 Beyond The Final Episode – Harman Publishers Delhi – 2002
 Jalasamaadhi – Poorna Publications – 2004
 Agniveena – Current Books – 2005
 Dayaharji – Poorna Publications – 2010

History and Legends 
Tales of Malabar – Prism Books, Bangalore – 2020

Music
 Sapthaswarangal
 Karnaataka Sangeetha Lokam – Mathrubhumi Books – 2007

Biography
 Meera – Mathrubhumi Books – 2006
 Amaavaasiyile Nakshatrangal – Poorna Publications −2007
 Sakthan Thampuran  - Poorna Publications
 Bharathathile Rishikavikal (Biography of 150 Saint Poets of India, in Malayalam) - Mathrubhoomi  Publications - 2019

Translation
From English To Malayalam

 Pride & Prejudice - Translation of "Pride & Prejudice" by Jane Austin - Mathrubhoomi Publications -
Kerala Samskaaram Oru Thiranottam - Translation of "Glimpses of Kerala Culture" by Princess Aswathy Thirunal Gauri Lakshmibayi – Mathrubhoomi Publications - 2012
Paliam Charithram - Translation of Paliam History by Prof. Radha Devi – Paliam Trust – 2013
Choothu - Translation of "AJAYA" by Anand Neelakantan - Mathrubhoomi Publications - 2017
Kali - Translation of "Kali" by Anand Neelakantan - Mathrubhoomi Publications - 2017
Shareeram Udaattamaaya Orupakaranam - Translation of "Body - The Greatest Gadget " By Sadguru Jaggi Vasudev - Mathrubhoomi Publications - 2016

From Malayalam To English

Ever with love P.K.Warrier - Translation of "Sasneham P.K Warrier" by Dr. Muralidharan – Kottakkal Aryavaidyasala – 2012
 Aithihyamaala – Translation of the legendary work "Aithihyamala" by Kottarathil Shankkunni  – Mathrubhoomi Publications - 2010
Vishnu Sahasra Naamam commentary - Translation of  "Vishnu Sahasra Naamam Vyakhyanam by Acharya A.K.B.NAIR- Bharathiya Vidya Bhavan Publication - 2016
Himalayan  Odyssey -Translation of “Hymavathabhoovil” by Sri.M.P Veerendrakumar, M.P.) - Penguin Random House - 2019

Children's Tales
 Then Kinnom
Aithyhyamaalaa abridged version (English)

Awards
 Rotary Literary Award – Parithraanam – 1997
 Tatapuram Sukumaran Award –  Vidhavakalude Graamam – 1999
 Malayala Dinam Award – Contributions to Malayalam literature – 2008
 Samskaara Sahiti Award – Contributions to Malayalam literature – 2010
 Khasak Award –  Pulachindu – 2011
 INSA-Literary Award – Contributions to Malayalam literature – 2011
 Dr.Suvarna Nalapat Trust Award – Translation of Aithihyamala– 2014

References

External links

Indian women poets
Indian women short story writers
Poets from Kerala
Writers from Kochi
Malayalam-language writers
Living people
1950 births
Indian women novelists
Indian women composers
Indian women children's writers
Indian children's writers
20th-century Indian biographers
20th-century Indian poets
20th-century Indian novelists
20th-century Indian short story writers
20th-century Indian women writers
Indian women non-fiction writers
Women biographers
Women writers from Kerala
Novelists from Kerala
21st-century Indian women writers
21st-century Indian biographers